The 1983 season was the Minnesota Vikings' 23rd in the National Football League (NFL), and their 17th under head coach Bud Grant. After starting 6–2, the Vikings lost six of their next seven – including a home loss to the 0–9 Tampa Bay Buccaneers – and were eliminated from playoff contention with one week to play.

Even with the loss to Tampa Bay, Minnesota would have won the NFC Central Division championship if not for a 13–2 loss to the Detroit Lions on Monday Night Football in week 14. 

The team finished 8–8 record and failed to reach the playoffs for the third time in five seasons. At the end of the season, Grant retired as head coach, although he returned for a final season in 1985.

Offseason

1983 Draft

 The Vikings traded their 2nd-round selection (46th overall) to Philadelphia in exchange for defensive tackle Charlie Johnson.
 The Vikings traded offensive tackle Ron Yary to the Los Angeles Rams in exchange for the Rams' 10th-round selection (255th overall).

Roster

Preseason

Regular season

Schedule

Against the Detroit Lions in Week 14, the Vikings became the 35th team in NFL history and only the fifth since the 1970 NFL/AFL merger, to score just a safety in a game. This has happened only three times since: by the 1993 Cincinnati Bengals, the 2011 Atlanta Falcons, and the 2013 Jacksonville Jaguars.

Standings

Statistics

Team leaders

League rankings

References

Minnesota Vikings seasons
Minnesota
Minnesota Vikings